Ricardo Silva (born May 9, 1988) is a former American football safety.

College career
Silva started his college football career at Bowie State University, before transferring
to Hampton for his junior and senior seasons. He exploded his senior season ( 74 tackles, 11 pass breakups, 4 interceptions, 3 forced fumbles, and 1 interception returned for a touchdown) making First-team All Mid-Eastern Athletic Conference, First-team HBCU All-American, and barely missing out being selected on the FCS All-American team.

Professional career

Detroit Lions
In 2011, he signed with the Detroit Lions to their practice squad. Silva was signed the active roster in week 12, finishing the season and including the playoffs playing primarily special teams. The following year Ricardo Silva played so well in the 2012 preseason that he just barely missed opening the season on the 53 man active roster. Coach Schwartz actually said Silva was the last man cut. The lions soon after signed Ricardo Silva to their practice squad.  Starting FS Louis Delmas injured his knee early in the year leading to Ricardo Silva being activated to the 53 man roster in the early weeks of 2012. Silva's second season ended totaling 6 starts, 40 tackles and 1 interception,1 fumble recovery on the year. On August 1, 2013, the Detroit Lions released Silva.

Carolina Panthers
On August 2, 2013, Silva was claimed off waivers by the Carolina Panthers. On August 24, 2013, he was waived by the Panthers.

Teaching career
Ricardo Silva joined Teach for America in 2014 and taught Geometry at Ballou High School in Washington D.C.

Loan Officer
Ricardo worked as an Account Executive prior to being promoted to Assistant Vice President at New Day USA. He is now currently employed as a Loan Officer with First Home Mortgage in Maryland.

References

1988 births
Living people
Detroit Lions players
Carolina Panthers players
American football safeties
Hampton Pirates football players
Players of American football from Baltimore